James Reginald Hogan,  is an Australian airline executive. Between 2006 and mid-2017, he was the President and CEO of Etihad Airways, one of the national airlines of the United Arab Emirates (UAE).

Early life and career
James Hogan grew up in Melbourne, Victoria, and attended Ivanhoe Grammar School, graduating in 1975.

James Hogan began his career in 1975 at Ansett Airlines as an ordinary employee including check-in assistant. He subsequently held senior positions with Hertz Corporation, where his roles included directorships of the marketing, sales, and operations divisions. In 1995 he joined the London-based executive management committee as Vice President of Marketing and Sales for Europe, the Middle East, and Africa. In 1997 Hogan became service director for British Midland International (BMI), leaving in 1998 to join the Granada Group as worldwide sales director, where he sat on the board of Forte Hotels. He returned to BMI in 1999 as chief operating officer, where he was responsible for flight and ground operations, sales and marketing, commercial, cargo, engineering and handling service companies; he was a member of the board of directors.

In 2001 Hogan moved back to his native Australia, where he was appointed chief executive of the Tesna consortium, which was created with the aim of acquiring Ansett Airlines from administration. 

In May 2002, he joined Gulf Air as CEO. In December 2002 he instigated a restructuring and turnaround programme in response to a drastic fall in profits and increasing debt. Gulf Air recorded a profit of US$4 million in 2004 before returning to losses. He resigned his position in July 2006 and left Gulf Air at the end of September.

CEO of Etihad Airways
On 10 September 2006, he was appointed president and CEO of Etihad Airways, the UAE flag carrier based in Abu Dhabi. He oversaw Etihad's rapid growth to serving 86 passenger and cargo destinations in the Middle East, Africa, Europe, Asia, Australia, and the Americas, operating a fleet of 120 aircraft.

Etihad reported its first full-year net profit in 2011, of $14 million, in line with its strategic plan goals announced in 2006. In February 2013 the airline announced a net profit of $42 million for 2012.

He oversaw Etihad's strategy of creating a network through acquisitions of minority stakes in other airlines, specifically Air Berlin (29.21%), Air Seychelles (40%), Aer Lingus (2.987%), Virgin Australia (24.9%), Air Serbia (49%), Darwin Airline (33%), Jet Airways (24%) and Alitalia (49%).

On 27 April 2016 Etihad reported a net profit of US$103 million for 2015. In May, the management structure was reshuffled, as Hogan became CEO of the airline's parent company, Etihad Aviation Group. Peter Baumgartner, formerly the airline's Chief Commercial Officer, became CEO of the airline, reporting to Hogan. In December Handelsblatt Global reported that Hogan was going to be dismissed after a "failed spree of acquisitions in Europe."

On 24 January 2017, the Etihad Aviation Group Board of Directors announced that Hogan (along with Group CFO James Rigney) would be stepping down "in the second half of 2017". Peter Baumgartner, (former CEO of the airline), became the acting CEO of the group as it faced mounting losses from its investments in Air Berlin and Alitalia. On 2 May 2017 Alitalia filed for bankruptcy. Hogan and Rigney left Etihad later that month. On 27 July Etihad reported a loss of US$1.873 billion for 2016. On 15 August Air Berlin filed for bankruptcy after Etihad withdrew its financial support. Etihad reported a net loss of US$1.52 billion for 2017.

Hogan is now the founder and chairman of Knighthood Capital, based in Switzerland.

Affiliations and awards
Hogan is a fellow of the Royal Aeronautical Society and a former non-executive director, and member of the board's Audit Committee, of the Gallaher Group. In 2010, he served as the chairman of the Aviation Travel and Tourism Governors at the World Economic Forum in Davos, Switzerland. He currently serves on the executive committee of the World Travel and Tourism Council. In June 2011 he was appointed to the International Air Transport Association (IATA) Board of Governors.

CEO Middle East magazine named him Aviation CEO of the Year in 2008 and Visionary of the Year in 2010. He won the CAPA Airline Executive of the Year 2012 Award at the Centre for Aviation's global awards for excellence and leadership in 2012.

In the Australian 2017 Queen's Birthday Honours List, Hogan was appointed an Officer of the Order of Australia (AO).

References

Further reading
 
 
 
 

1956 births
Living people
Australian expatriates in the United Arab Emirates
Australian chief executives
Chief executives in the airline industry
Fellows of the Royal Aeronautical Society
Chief operating officers
Officers of the Order of Australia
Etihad Airways
People educated at Ivanhoe Grammar School